Disphericus is a genus of beetles in the family Carabidae, containing the following species:

 Disphericus alluaudi Basilewsky, 1938 
 Disphericus benadirensis G.Muller, 1941 
 Disphericus carinulatus Basilewsky, 1955 
 Disphericus clavicornis Kolbe, 1895 
 Disphericus conradti Kolbe, 1895 
 Disphericus deplanatus G.Muller, 1949 
 Disphericus gambianus G.R.Waterhouse, 1842 
 Disphericus insulanus Basilewsky, 1955 
 Disphericus katangensis Burgeon, 1935 
 Disphericus kolbei Alluaud, 1914 
 Disphericus meneghettii G.Muller, 1949 
 Disphericus multiporus Bates, 1886 
 Disphericus quangoanus Quedenfeldt, 1883 
 Disphericus rhodesianus Peringuey, 1904 
 Disphericus silvestrii G.Muller, 1949 
 Disphericus sulcostriatus Fairmaire, 1887 
 Disphericus tarsalis Bates, 1886 
 Disphericus zavattarii G.Muller, 1939

References

Panagaeinae